Schmickler is a surname. Notable people with the surname include:

Marcus Schmickler (born 1968), German composer
Wilfried Schmickler (born 1954), German comedian

See also
Schickler